The Copeland Septet (also Copeland's Septet, Hickson Compact Group 57) is a group of galaxies in the constellation Leo that includes NGC 3748, NGC 3754, NGC 3750, NGC 3751, NGC 3745, NGC 3753 and NGC 3746. The group was discovered by British astronomer Ralph Copeland in 1874. The location of Copeland's Septet is right ascension  / declination  (2000.0), about three degrees northwest of third magnitude star 93 Leonis.

See also
 Wild's Triplet
 Zwicky's Triplet
 Robert's Quartet
 Stephan's Quintet and NGC 7331 Group (also known as the Deer Lick Group located about half a degree northeast of Stephan's Quintet)
 Seyfert's Sextet

References

Leo (constellation)
57